Spodnja Vižinga is a settlement on the left bank of the Drava River in the Municipality of Radlje ob Dravi in Slovenia.

References

External links
Spodnja Vižinga on Geopedia

Populated places in the Municipality of Radlje ob Dravi